The Hawaiian tropical rainforests are a tropical moist broadleaf forest ecoregion in the Hawaiian Islands. Moist bogs and shrublands exist on montane plateaus and depressions. For the 28 million years of existence of the Hawaiian Islands, they have been isolated from the rest of the world by vast stretches of the Pacific Ocean, and this isolation has resulted in the evolution of an incredible diversity of endemic species, including fungi, mosses, snails, birds, and other wildlife. In the lush, moist forests high in the mountains, trees are draped with vines, orchids, ferns, and mosses. This ecoregion includes one of the world's wettest places, the slopes of Mount Waialeale, which average  of rainfall per year.

Coastal mesic forests
These forests have been dominated by the native hala (Pandanus tectorius) and hau (Hibiscus tiliaceus) and naturalized (Polynesian introductions) kukui (Aleurites moluccana) and milo (Thespesia populnea) for the past 1,000–2,000 years. The Polynesian-introduced noni (Morinda citrifolia), pia (Tacca leontopetaloides), and kī (Cordyline fruticosa) are also common in this zone. Other native species include pololei (Ophioglossum concinnum), ākia (Wikstroemia spp.), loulu fan palms (Pritchardia spp.), ōhia lehua (Metrosideros polymorpha), and lama (Diospyros sandwicensis).

Mixed mesic forests
The forest canopy, dominated by koa (Acacia koa) and ōhia lehua (Metrosideros polymorpha), is somewhat open, but tree density is rather high. Other trees and shrubs include pāpala (Charpentiera obovata), olopua (Nestegis sandwicensis), hame (Antidesma platyphyllum), mēhame (A. pulvinatum), kōpiko (Psychotria mariniana), ōpiko (P. mauiensis),  iliahi (Santalum freycinetianum), hōlei (Ochrosia spp.), poolā (Claoxylon sandwicense), kōlea lau nui (Myrsine lessertiana), kauila (Alphitonia ponderosa), nioi (Eugenia reinwardtiana), aiai (Streblus pendulinus), and hōawa (Pittosporum spp.).

Wet forests
They receive  of rain per year.  Ōhia lehua (Metrosideros polymorpha) is the dominant canopy species in wet forests, but koa (Acacia koa) is also very common. Other trees include kāwau (Ilex anomala), alani (Melicope clusiifolia), ōhia ha (Syzygium sandwicensis), kōlea lau nui (Myrsine lessertiana), ohe (Tetraplasandra spp.), and olomea (Perrottetia  sandwicensis) as well as hāpuu (Cibotium tree ferns). Apeape (Gunnera petaloidea), oha wai (Clermontia spp.), hāhā (Cyanea spp.), kāmakahala (Labordia hirtella), kanawao (Broussaisia arguta), Phyllostegia spp., ākala (Rubus hawaiensis), kāmanamana (Adenostemma lavenia), Pilea peploides, māmaki (Pipturus albidus), olonā (Touchardia latifolia), and alaala wai nui (Peperomia spp.) are common understory plants. Vines include maile (Alyxia oliviformis) and hoi kuahiwi (Smilax  melastomifolia). Iei.e. (Freycinetia arborea), puaakuhinia (Astelia menziesiana) and  ōlapa (Cheirodendron trigynum) are epiphytic flowering plants found in wet forests. Epiphytic ferns, such as Adenophorus spp., ohiaku (Hymenophyllum recurvum), Ophioglossum pendulum, ākaha (Asplenium nidus), ēkaha (Elaphoglossum hirtum), and makue lau lii (Grammitis hookeri), cover trees. Epyphytic mosses include Acroporium fuscoflavum, Rhizogonium spiniforme, and Macromitrium owahiense. Loulu fan palms (Pritchardia spp.) may tower over the forest canopy.

Bogs
Bogs are found in montane regions where rainfall exceeds drainage.  Dominant vegetation in bogs are shrubs, sedges, and grasses. Larger shrubs and small trees grow on bog perimeters or on raised hummocks.  Carex spp., Oreobolus furcatus, and Rhynchospora rugosa are common sedges, shrubs include ōhelo kau laau (Vaccinium calycinum) and ōhelo (V. dentatum), while grasses are represented by Dichanthelium spp. and Deschampsia nubigena. Dwarf varieties of ōhia lehua (Metrosideros polymorpha vars. incana and glabriofolia) are the most seen trees on the edges of bogs.  The ferns wāwaeiole (Lycopodiella cernua), amau (Sadleria spp.), and uluhe (Dicranopteris linearis) grow in bogs.  Rare plants include liliwai (Acaena exigua), naenae (Dubautia spp.), and Argyroxiphium spp.

See also
 Oceanian realm
 Big Bog, Maui
 Tropical and subtropical moist broadleaf forests
 Hawaiian tropical dry forests
 List of ecoregions in the United States (WWF)

References

External links
 Bioimages.vanderbilt.edu: Hawaii Tropical Moist Forests Ecoregion image gallery 
 Bioimages.vanderbilt.edu: slow modem version

Ecoregions of Hawaii
Tropical and subtropical moist broadleaf forests of the United States

Forests of Hawaii
Oceanian ecoregions
.
.
.
.
.
.